Arroyito is a city and district located in the Concepción Department of Paraguay. It is one of the newest districts in the country, created in November 2016.

References

Districts of Concepción Department, Paraguay
Populated places in Concepción Department, Paraguay
Populated places established in 2016